Ida Kovács (born 5 September 1975) is a Hungarian long-distance runner. She competed in the women's marathon at the 2004 Summer Olympics.

References

1975 births
Living people
Athletes (track and field) at the 2004 Summer Olympics
Hungarian female long-distance runners
Hungarian female marathon runners
Olympic athletes of Hungary
Place of birth missing (living people)